The Nanortalik Museum is an outdoor museum in Nanortalik, Kujalleq Municipality, Greenland.

Architecture
The museum consists of 9 historical buildings group together into the museum complex, as well as various artifacts at its outdoor area. The museum is the largest outdoor museum in Greenland.

See also
 List of museums in Greenland

References

Museums in Greenland
Kujalleq